The GayVN Award for Best Actor is an award presented annually by AVN Media Network at the GayVN Awards, given to a gay porn actor for his performance in a leading role in a film released that year.

Initially, achievements in gay pornography were recognized by AVN Media Network at the AVN Awards, until the creation of the GayVN Awards. The 1st GayVN Awards ceremony was held in 1998, with Vince Rockland receiving the award for his performance in Three Brothers. The second ceremony was held in 2000, with the GayVN Awards taking place annually until 2010. Following this the GayVN Awards would enter a seven-year hiatus, coming back in 2018.

Since its inception, the award has been given to 20 actors. With two wins, Tony Donovan is the only actor to have won this award more than once, as well as the only one to achieve two consecutive wins. DeAngelo Jackson is the only man of color to win in this category, for Blended Family in 2020. As of the 2022 ceremony, the most recent recipients are Michael DelRay for The Last Course and Alex Riley for Return to Helix Academy Parts 1 & 2.

Winners and nominees

1990s

2000s

2010s

2020s

References

Pornographic film awards
Gay pornographic film awards
American pornographic film awards